Joseph Lumpkin Merrell (1862-1939) was a sheriff of Carroll County, Georgia at the turn of the 20th century who gained nationwide fame for stopping a lynching. Articles about his bravery appeared in the New York Evening Post, the Atlanta Constitution, the Louisville Courier Journal, the Washington Star, and the Boston Herald. He is also mentioned by Mark Twain in his 1901 essay The United States of Lyncherdom. Merrell's last name was often misspelled in the press as "Merrill."

References

People from Carroll County, Georgia
Lynching in the United States
Georgia (U.S. state) sheriffs
1862 births
1939 deaths